Guillaume Samica (born 28 September 1981) is a French former professional volleyball player, a member of the France national team from 2003 to 2012. A participant at the Olympic Games Athens 2004, and a silver medallist at the 2009 European Championship and the 2006 World League.

Personal life
Samica was born in Choisy-au-Bac. He has Polish and Italian origins.

Career
In December 2014 he moved to Polish club AZS Częstochowa and signed a contract with this team to the end of the 2014/2015 season. Then he went to another Polish club, AZS Politechnika Warszawska and he was playing there until 2018.

Honours

Clubs
 CEV Challenge Cup
  2008/2009 – with Jastrzębski Węgiel

 National championships
 2006/2007  French Championship, with Stade Poitevin Poitiers
 2009/2010  Greek Cup, with Panathinaikos
 2009/2010  Greek Championship, with Panathinaikos
 2012/2013  Argentine Championship, with Buenos Aires Unidos

External links
 
 Player profile at LegaVolley.it 
 Player profile at PlusLiga.pl 
 Player profile at Volleybox.net

References

1981 births
Living people
Sportspeople from Oise
French men's volleyball players
Olympic volleyball players of France
Volleyball players at the 2004 Summer Olympics
French expatriate sportspeople in Italy
Expatriate volleyball players in Italy
French expatriate sportspeople in Poland
Expatriate volleyball players in Poland
French expatriate sportspeople in Greece
Expatriate volleyball players in Greece
French expatriate sportspeople in Russia
Expatriate volleyball players in Russia
French expatriate sportspeople in Argentina
Expatriate volleyball players in Argentina
Blu Volley Verona players
Jastrzębski Węgiel players
Panathinaikos V.C. players
ZAKSA Kędzierzyn-Koźle players
AZS Częstochowa players
Projekt Warsaw players
Outside hitters